The 1918 Mid Armagh by-election was held on 23 January 1918.  The by-election was held due to the resignation of the incumbent Conservative MP, Sir John Lonsdale. It was won by his brother, the Conservative candidate James Rolston Lonsdale, who was unopposed.

References

1918 elections in the United Kingdom
By-elections to the Parliament of the United Kingdom in County Armagh constituencies
Unopposed by-elections to the Parliament of the United Kingdom (need citation)
20th century in County Armagh
1918 elections in Ireland